Hyper Sports, known in Japan as  is an Olympic-themed sports video game released by Konami for arcades in 1984. It is the sequel to 1983's Track & Field and features seven new Olympic events.  Like its predecessor, Hyper Sports has two run buttons and one action button per player. The Japanese release of the game sported an official license for the 1984 Summer Olympics.

Gameplay
The gameplay is much the same as Track & Field in that the player competes in an event and tries to score the most points based on performance criteria, and also by beating the computer entrants in that event. Also, the player tries to exceed a qualification time, distance, or score to advance to the next event.  In Hyper Sports, if all of the events are passed successfully, the player advances to the next round of the same events which are faster and harder to qualify for.

The events changed to include these new sports:
Swimming - Swimming speed is controlled by two run buttons, and breathing is controlled by the action button when prompted by swimmer on screen. There is one re-do if a player fouls due to launching before the gun, but only one "run" at the qualifying time.
Skeet shooting - Selecting left or right shot via the two run buttons while a clay-bird is in the sight. There are three rounds to attempt to pass the qualifying score. If a perfect score is attained then a different pattern follows allowing for a higher score.
Long horse - Speed to run at horse is computer controlled, player jumps and pushes off horse via the action button, and rotates as many times as possible via run buttons (and tries to land straight up on feet). There are three attempts at the qualifying score.
Archery - Firing of the arrow controlled by action button; the elevation angle is controlled by depressing the action button and releasing at the proper time. There are three attempts at passing the qualifying score.
Triple jump - Speed is controlled by the run buttons, jump and angle are controlled by action button. There are three attempts at the qualifying distance, and player fouls if first jump is after the white line.
Weight lifting - Power used to lift weights is controlled by run buttons, while shift of weight from lifting up to pushing above the head is controlled by action button. There are two attempts at the qualifying weight.
Pole vault - Speed to run is preset by computer, while release of pole and body movement is controlled by the action button.  Players continue attempting the increasing heights until they foul out (by missing base at the bottom or by knocking off horizontal bar with body at the top). The third foul disqualifies the player. (This event was not included in the ZX Spectrum version.)

Reception

Arcade
In Japan, Game Machine listed Hyper Sports on their August 1, 1984 issue as being the sixth most-successful table arcade unit of the month. The following month, it was one of the top five table arcade cabinets on the Game Machine charts. In North America, it appeared in the Play Meter arcade charts for several months through November 1984, when it was one of the top four dedicated arcade cabinets at amusement arcade locations and one of the top three at street locations. However, it was not as successful as its predecessor in North America. In Europe, it became the number-one game arcade game in the United Kingdom.

The arcade game was reviewed by Gene Lewin of Play Meter in late 1984, rating the game 9 out of 10. Roger C. Sharpe of Play Meter called it an "exceptional follow-up" to Track & Field.

Ports
Upon release of the home computer conversions, the ZX Spectrum version was the biggest-selling Spectrum game on the monthly UK Gallup charts. The home computer conversions of Hyper Sports went on to top the UK all-formats chart for two months in the summer of 1985, from July to August.

The Commodore 64 version was reviewed by Zzap!64 who said that it was "a first rate conversion" and praised graphics, sound and presentation and received a 90% rating overall. The ZX Spectrum version won the award for best sports simulation of the year from Crash magazine, and was later voted number 59 in the Your Sinclair "Top 100 Games of All Time" list. David M. Wilson and Johnny L. Wilson of Computer Gaming World reviewed the game for the Apple II and Commodore 64 in 1988, stating that "the game is a fast-paced joystick buster which will delight arcade fanatics".

Legacy
Two events from the game, skeet shooting and vault, featured on the BBC television programme First Class.

In June 2018, Konami announced a reimagining of the game, Hyper Sports R, for Nintendo Switch, but the game was cancelled in June 2020.

Notes

References

External links
 Hyper Sports entry at the Centuri.net Arcade Database

1984 Summer Olympics
1984 video games
Amstrad CPC games
Arcade video games
BBC Micro and Acorn Electron games
Commodore 64 games
Konami games
MSX games
NEC PC-8001 games
Nintendo Switch games
PlayStation 4 games
SG-1000 games
Sharp X1 games
Video games scored by Martin Galway
Video games set in 1984
Video games set in Los Angeles
ZX Spectrum games
Multiplayer and single-player video games
Konami arcade games
Video games developed in Japan
Hamster Corporation games